Majdouline Idrissi (born 10 March 1977) is a Moroccan actress and comedian.

Biography
Idrissi was born in Rabat in 1977. Her parents are of Berber ancestry. Idrissi dreamed of becoming a ballerina, enrolling in ballet lessons at the age of four. At age 16, she moved to Montreal to study business management, and discovered her passion for cinema after she went with a friend to a theater competition. In 2003, she made her film debut in El Bandia, which was popular among younger audiences. She starred as Habiba in the 2006 film La Symphonie marocaine, directed by Kamal Kamal. Idrissi played Jamila in Souad Hamidou's 2009 film Camille and Jamila. She portrayed Rihanna, a sick girl at a mental asylum, in Pégase in 2010, and received her first prize for her performance. In 2016, Idrissi played Myriam, one of the leading female roles, in Divines, directed by Houda Benyamina. The film won the Caméra d'Or at the Cannes Film Festival.  Idrissi has also acted in theatrical productions and has been praised for her versatility as an actress.

In a 2019 interview, she stated that she cannot wear a bathing suit to the beach for fear of public harassment from photographers due to her fame.

Partial filmography
2002 : Oueld El Derb 
2003 : El Bandia 
2006 : La Symphonie marocaine : Habiba
2009 : Camille and Jamila : Jamila
2010 : Pégase : Rihanna
2011 : Sur la route du paradis : Leila
2013 : Sarirou al assrar
2013 : Youm ou lila
2014 : L'Orchestre des aveugles : Fatima
2014 : Itar el-layl : Nadia
2016 : Divines : Myriam
2017 : Au pays des merveilles
2019 : Doumoue Warda
2020 : Daba tazyan (TV series)

References

External links
Majdouline Idrissi at the Internet Movie Database

1977 births
Living people
21st-century Moroccan actresses
Moroccan film actresses
Moroccan television actresses
People from Rabat